This is a list of heads of government of Grenada, from the establishment of the office of Chief Minister in 1960 to the present day.

The Prime Minister appoints the Cabinet of Grenada.

Heads of government before the 1974 independence

Chief ministers of Grenada (1960–1967)

Premiers of the Associated State of Grenada (1967–1974)

Heads of government after the 1974 independence

Prime Minister of Grenada (1974–1979)

Prime ministers of the People's Revolutionary Government of Grenada (1979–1983)

Head of the Revolutionary Military Council of Grenada (1983)

Governor-General of Grenada (1983)

Chairman of the Interim Advisory Council (1983–1984)

Prime ministers of Grenada (1984–present)

See also 

 Prime Ministers of Queen Elizabeth II
 Prime Ministers of King Charles III
 List of Commonwealth Heads of Government
 Politics of Grenada
 Prime Minister of the West Indies Federation
 Governor-General of Grenada
 List of heads of state of Grenada
 List of Privy Counsellors (1952–2022)
 Leader of the Opposition (Grenada)

References

Grenada, List of heads of government of
 
Prime
Prime Ministers
1974 establishments in Grenada